The Quebec Castors or Quebec Beavers were a professional ice hockey team based in Quebec City, Quebec from 1926 until 1935. They were members of the Canadian–American Hockey League (CAHL).

History
The team first played in the 1926–27 season. They played one further season in 1927–28, before going on hiatus until 1932 when the club was revived. The revived team played a further three seasons before disbanding for good in 1935. The owner, Lucien Garneau, transferred his CAHL franchise to Springfield, Massachusetts, and used it to form the second Springfield Indians.

References
 

Ice hockey teams in Quebec City
Canadian-American Hockey League teams
1926 establishments in Quebec
1935 disestablishments in Quebec
Ice hockey clubs established in 1926
Ice hockey clubs disestablished in 1935